Prestonia rotundifolia is a species of plant in the family Apocynaceae. It is native to Colombia and Ecuador.  Its natural habitats are subtropical or tropical dry forests and subtropical or tropical moist lowland forests. It is threatened by habitat loss.

References

Flora of Colombia
Flora of Ecuador
rotundifolia
Endangered plants
Taxonomy articles created by Polbot